Christian Tourret (born 20 September 1946) is a French athlete. He competed in the men's long jump at the 1972 Summer Olympics, At the 1970 European Athletics Indoor Championships he came ninth in the men's long jump final.

References

1946 births
Living people
Athletes (track and field) at the 1972 Summer Olympics
French male long jumpers
Olympic athletes of France
Place of birth missing (living people)